Mexican Moon is the fifth studio album by alternative rock band Concrete Blonde.

Mexican Moon takes the gothic rock of the previous albums and adds more of a hard rock edge to it.  Johnette Napolitano provided the vocals, bass guitar, samples, and the album artwork. Paul Thompson played drums and James Mankey played guitar.

"Jenny I Read" details the rise to stardom and subsequent fall into happy obscurity of a fashion model (rumoured to be Bettie Page), while "Mexican Moon" finds Napolitano singing about a failed romance and fleeing into Mexico.  The song "Jonestown" is a critique of the theology surrounding the Jonestown Massacre and opens with a minute-long sample of Jim Jones ranting about warfare. "End of the Line" is a Roxy Music song, written by Bryan Ferry and released on Siren.

On the closing track, "Bajo la Lune Mexicana," Napolitano (who does not speak Spanish) wrote the Spanish lyrics, which are a literal translation of the lyrics to the album's title track. However, none of the verbs are conjugated, noun gender is ignored, and correct grammar is non-existent; it doesn't detract from the overall translation from Spanish to English.

Critical reception
People wrote that "even in its quieter moments, Mexican Moon seethes with emotion." Trouser Press wrote: "Napolitano — who is still a mighty bad singer and doesn’t seem to know it — gives her headstrong, knicker-twisting all to the effort, and very nearly gets by on sheer gumption."

Track listing
All songs written by Johnette Napolitano, except where noted.

Personnel
Credits are adapted from the Mexican Moon CD album booklet.

Concrete Blonde
 Johnette Napolitano – vocals (all tracks), guitars (tracks 1, 3, 5, 7–8, 12), bass (tracks 1, 3–4, 7–8), keyboards (track 12), percussion (tracks 6–7, 9, 11), electric guitar (tracks 2, 13), piano (track 9)
 James Mankey – guitars (tracks 1, 4–12), bass (tracks 2, 5-6, 9–11, 13), guitar synthesizer (tracks 6–7, 11), vocals (track 9), Spanish guitar (tracks 2, 13), acoustic guitar (tracks 2, 13), additional voices (track 4)
 Paul Thompson – drums (tracks 3–9, 11–12), timpani (tracks 3, 5), percussion (tracks 6–7)

Additional musicians
 Harry Rushakoff – drums (tracks 1–2, 10, 13)
 Andy Prieboy – additional voices (track 4), additional piano (track 9), piano (track 12)
 Jeff Trott – additional voices (track 4)
 Texacala Jones – vocals (track 10)

Production
 Concrete Blonde – producer
 Sean Freehill – producer, recording, additional drum programming
 Alex Gordon, Robert Fayer – recording assistance
 Earle Mankey – additional recording
 Robert Read – additional recording assistance
 Tim Palmer – mixing
 Mark O'Donoghue, Jamie Seyberth – assistant mixers
 Ted Jensen – mastering

Other
 Johnette Napolitano – paintings, photographs
 Stephen Stickler – band photograph
 Brigid Pearson – cover design, assemblage

Charts

References

External links 
 Concrete Blonde (official website)

1993 albums
Concrete Blonde albums
I.R.S. Records albums